Beni Hofer (born May 3, 1978 in Zweisimmen) is a Swiss freestyle skier, specializing in ski cross and a former alpine skier.

Hofer competed at the 2010 Winter Olympics for Switzerland. He placed 27th in the qualifying round in ski cross, to advance to the knockout stages. He advanced from the first round by finishing second in his heat, but finished 4th in his quarterfinal, failing to advance to the semifinals.

As of March 2013, his best showing at the World Championships is 10th, in 2005.

Hofer made his World Cup debut in January 2008. As of March 2013, he has one World Cup podium finish, a bronze at Flaine in 2007/08. His best World Cup overall finish in ski cross is 13th, in 2004/05.

World Cup Podiums

References

1978 births
Living people
Olympic freestyle skiers of Switzerland
Freestyle skiers at the 2010 Winter Olympics
Swiss male freestyle skiers
Swiss male alpine skiers
People from Davos
Sportspeople from Graubünden
21st-century Swiss people